The 1975–76 season was the sixth season of the Portland Trail Blazers in the National Basketball Association (NBA). The Blazers finished at 37–45, one game shy of their franchise high from the previous year.  Despite finishing with a better record than the Detroit Pistons of the Midwest Division, the Pistons made the playoffs and the Blazers did not.

Draft picks

Note:  This is not a complete list; only the first two rounds are covered, as well as any other picks by the franchise who played at least one NBA game.

Roster

Regular season

October 
Three of the first four games of the 1975–76 season for the Trail Blazers were played on the road. It proved to be a stiff opening test for the team, as they lost all three road games handily, and narrowly missed beating the Phoenix Suns in the lone home game of the opening month.

The opening game of the season was a visit to Seattle to face the SuperSonics on October 24. The Blazers started out well, leading 28–24 after the first quarter. However, by halftime Seattle was leading 57–53. The Blazers came back and made it a one-point game by the start of the fourth quarter, but Seattle pulled away, winning the fourth quarter by a 27–20 margin, and thus the game, 105–97. Geoff Petrie led the Blazers with 25 points, and Sidney Wicks added 20. Lloyd Neal fouled out after amassing 6 fouls to go along with 15 points. The Blazers' record: 0–1. For the SuperSonics, the leaders were Fred Brown with 29 points, and Slick Watts with 17. The game was played in front of a crowd of 13,601.

Portland were home the following evening to face the Phoenix Suns, on October 25. The Blazers blew an 11-point lead they had amassed after the first three-quarters, as the Suns dominated the final quarter, 26–12, to take the game by a final score of 89–88. It was a tough way to start the home portion of the season's schedule, and it would take a little more 'killer instinct' if they wanted to finish off teams and progress in the direction towards success. Bill Walton led the Blazers with 33 points, and Sidney Wicks chipped in 21. The Suns were guided by Paul Westphal's 17 points, while Nate Hawthorne and Alvin Adams contributed 14. Mike Bantom fouled out for Phoenix after failing to sink a single basket. This contest was played in front of a crowd of 11,274 incredibly disappointed partisans. The Blazers dropped to 0–2, while the Suns went to 1–0.

Season standings

z – clinched division title
y – clinched division title
x – clinched playoff spot

Record vs. opponents

Awards and honors
 Lionel Hollins, NBA All-Rookie Team 1st Team

References

Portland Trail Blazers seasons
Portland
Portland Trail Blazers 1975
Portland Trail Blazers 1976
Portland
Portland